Apollonius of Clazomenae, was an ambassador among a delegation, together with Apollonides of Clazomenae, who was sent from Clazomenae to the Seleucid ruler Antiochus IV Epiphanes in 170 BCE, after the latter had made himself master of Egypt.

Notes

Ancient Greek diplomats
2nd-century BC Greek people
People from Clazomenae
2nd-century BC diplomats